Ripunath Seth (27 October 1958 – 27 March 2022) was an Indian politician. A member of the Indian National Congress, he served in the Odisha Legislative Assembly from 1995 to 2000. He died in Barapali on 27 March 2022 at the age of 63.

References

1958 births
2022 deaths
Odisha MLAs 1995–2000
People from Bargarh district
Indian National Congress politicians from Odisha